Statistics of the Scottish Football League in season 1927–28.

Scottish League Division One

Scottish League Division Two

See also
1927–28 in Scottish football

References

 
Scottish Football League seasons